The 2005 Nicholls State Colonels football team represented Nicholls State University as a member of the Southland Conference during the 2005 NCAA Division I-AA football season. Led by second-year head Jay Thomas, the Colonels compiled an overall record of 6–4 with a mark of 5–1 in conference play, sharing the Southland title with Texas State. Nicholls State advanced to the NCAA Division I-AA Football Championship playoffs, losing to Furman in the first round. The team played home games at John L. Guidry Stadium in Thibodaux, Louisiana.

Schedule

References

Nicholls State
Nicholls Colonels football seasons
Southland Conference football champion seasons
Nicholls State Colonels football